The year 2008 is the first year in the history of Shark Fights, a mixed martial arts promotion based in the United States. In 2008 Shark Fights held 2 events beginning with, Shark Fights 1.

Events list

Shark Fights 1

Shark Fights 1 was an event held on October 24, 2008 at the Amarillo National Center in Amarillo, Texas.

Results

Shark Fights 2

Shark Fights 2 was an event held on December 13, 2008 at the Azteca Music Hall in Amarillo, Texas.

Results

See also 
 Shark Fights

References

Shark Fights events
2008 in mixed martial arts